Heart Trouble is a studio album by American recording artist Wanda Jackson. It was released on October 14, 2003 via CMH Records and contained 16 tracks. The disc was Jackson's forty first studio release of her career and her first disc released in the United States in a decade. The album was a mixture of Rockabilly and country recordings, featuring collaborations with musicians Elvis Costello, The Cramps and Rosie Flores. Heart Trouble received a positive response from critics following its release.

Background
Wanda Jackson had kept a busy touring schedule during much of the 1990s and early 2000s. According to Jackson herself, she had not released a proper rock album "in decades". In recent years, she had released gospel recordings, such as Generations (Of Gospel Music) (1993) and rock albums overseas such as The Queen of Rock' a 'Billy (1997). According to her autobiography, Jackson had originally planned to make an album of bluegrass songs. However, when word spread that she would be recording a new album in California, several rock musicians asked to be part of the project. "I might have been a grandma, but it was time rock again!", she recalled in her book.

Recording and content
Heart Trouble was produced by John Wooler, along with Anita Sills serving as executive producer. The album's sessions were recorded at the Steakhouse Studio, located in Hollywood, California. Jackson recalled enjoying the recording of Heart Trouble because she had time to prepare material: "Today, the process is approached much differently, and it was fun for me to take some time thinking about the arrangements and building rapport with the musicians." The album featured several collaborations with rock musicians, including Elvis Costello. Costello was brought to the project through the album's drummer Pete Thomas, who worked with him. Costello chose to record a duet version of Buck Owens' "Crying Time". The song was cut live in the studio. Jackson also recorded a cover of The Louvin Brothers "Cash on the Barrelhead". The album's title track was first recorded and released as a single by Martina McBride in 1994, reaching the top 25 of the American country songs chart.

Jackson also collaborated with rock group The Cramps for a remake of Jackson's 1961 song "Funnel of Love". Dave Alvin was also featured on several of the album's tracks, providing guitar instrumentation to three songs, including "Rockabilly Fever". Rosie Flores also joined Jackson for the project and recorded her self-penned track "Woman Walk Out the Door". The pair originally worked together ten years prior when Jackson appeared on Flores' 1995 album Rockabilly Filly. In addition, the Cadillac Angels joined Jackson on a remake of "Hard Headed Woman". Along with these remakes, Jackson re-recorded "Let's Have a Party", "Mean Mean Man" and "Riot in Cell Block Number 9".

Critical reception

Heart Trouble received mostly positive reviews upon its release. Thom Jurek of AllMusic gave the project a four-star rating, citing the album's "killer collection of songs" and Jackson's vocals that were "in fine shape". "Simply put, this is a rock & roll dream, full of raw, sharp performances, killer songs, and Jackson's irrepressible ability to take even the most innocent song and make it salacious," he concluded. Charlotte Robinson of PopMatters found that Jackson "is one of the few ’50s country/rock fusionists remaining who still tours on a regular basis and sounds just about as good as she did back in the day." Robinson praised the album's collaborations with Elvis Costello and Rosie Flores. She concluded positively in review, saying, "Still, to hear Jackson, now a grandmother, capture most of the snarls and hiccups she did in the old days is a real treat. Unlike many a smokin’, drinkin’ rocker, she's taken good care of her voice (are you listening Stevie Nicks?) and still has pretty impressive pipes. Thankfully, she's using them in the right way on this release, which is in every way a winner."

The album also received a positive response from OffBeat magazine, who compared it to Johnny Cash's American Recordings releases. "Heart Trouble is an excellent mix of new songs crafted to sound like the country and rockabilly standards that they join on this CD," reviewer Mike Perciaccante commented. Jon Johnson gave the album a mostly positive response, but criticized the record's rhythm section, highlighting the project's upright bass player and drummer. Still, Heart Trouble is well worth a listen, if only to marvel at Jackson's eternally young vocals," Johnson concluded. Robert Christgau wrote in Blender magazine that the album was well-produced but also criticized parts of the record. "Additional oomph, however, is in short supply here," he wrote.

Release
Heart Trouble was released on October 14, 2003 on CMH Records. It was originally distributed as a compact disc with 16 tracks. The same year, the album was distributed as a vinyl LP by Sympathy for the Record Industry, featuring 13 tracks. In the 2010s, the album was offered to digital sites including Apple Music. Following its original release, Jackson discussed the album with Country Music Television and noted she was pleased with the record's response: "All the reviews have talked about the energy the songs still have — and how I’ve still got the growl. It still sounds like Wanda Jackson. I guess that's the main thing."

Track listings

Compact disc and digital versions

Vinyl version

Personnel
All credits are adapted from the liner notes of Heart Trouble and AllMusic.

Musical personnel

 Dave Alvin – Guitar, guest artist
 Tony Balbinot – Guitar
 Brigette Bryant Blade – Background vocals
 Cadillac Angels – Background vocals, guest artist
 Elvis Costello – Acoustic guitar, guest artist, duet vocals
 The Cramps – Background vocals, guest artist
 Davey Faragher – Bass
 Rosie Flores – Background vocals, guest artist
 Siedah Garrett – Background vocals
 Stephen Hodges – Drums
 Dorian Holley – Background vocals
 Smokey Hormel – Banjo, guitar, mandolin
 James Intveld – Rhythm guitar

 Lux Interior – Background vocals
 Wanda Jackson – Lead vocals
 Randy Jacobs – Guitar
 Neil Larsen – Piano
 John McFee – Pedal steel guitar
 John Palmer – Drums
 Poison Ivy – Background vocals, guitar
 Lee Rocker – Bass, guest artist
 Larry Taylor – Bass
 Pete Thomas – Drums
 Michael Hart Thompson – Organ

Technical personnel
 Adam Byrne – Design, layout design
 John Cranfield – Assistant engineer
 Oz Fritz – Engineering, mixing
 Stephen Hodges – Percussion
 Sophie Olmstead – Photography
 Collin Rae – A&R
 Ron Sievers – Design, layout design
 Aretha Sills – A&R, executive producer
 Johnny Whiteside – Liner notes
 John Wooler – Producer

Release history

References

2003 albums
Wanda Jackson albums